Sir Herbert Stanley Oakeley, (22 July 1830 – 26 October 1903) was an English composer, most well known for his role as Professor of Music at the University of Edinburgh. Prior to his appointment to this role in 1865 he established his reputation as an organist, composer, and musician. During his tenure at the University of Edinburgh he founded a number of university musical societies across Scotland, most notably the Edinburgh University Music Society, and successfully resolved the university's Reid School of Music into a Faculty able to award degrees to its graduates. He socialized with and mentored contralto, composer, and festival organizer Mary Augusta Wakefield.

Life
He was born at Ealing on 22 July 1830.
He was second son of Sir Herbert Oakeley, 3rd Baronet. 
He was educated at Rugby and at Christ Church, Oxford, he graduated B.A. in 1853 and proceeded M.A. in 1856. 
He studied with Stephen Elvey. 
In 1865, he was elected Reid Professor of Music at Edinburgh University.

He was knighted in 1876 and in 1881 was appointed "Composer of Music to Queen Victoria in Scotland".

In June 1901 he received an honorary doctorate (LL.D) from the University of Glasgow during celebrations for the university´s 450th jubilee.

He retired from his professorship in 1891.
He died unmarried at Eastbourne on 26 October 1903.

See also
University of Edinburgh
Edinburgh University Music Society

Notes

References

External links
 
 Music Collection of Professor Sir Herbert Stanley Oakley (Details of Sir Herbert Oakeley's Music Collection, held by the University of Edinburgh Library's Special Collections Division.)
 Website of the Edinburgh University Music Society
 Website of the current Reid School of Music

1830 births
1903 deaths
19th-century classical composers
Composers awarded knighthoods
Younger sons of baronets
English classical composers
English conductors (music)
British male conductors (music)
People of the Victorian era
Classical composers of church music
Academics of the University of Edinburgh
19th-century English musicians
19th-century British composers
19th-century British male musicians